Konrad König (born 31 July 1961) is an Austrian boxer. He competed in the men's welterweight event at the 1984 Summer Olympics.

References

External links
 

1961 births
Living people
Austrian male boxers
Olympic boxers of Austria
Boxers at the 1984 Summer Olympics
People from Hallein
Welterweight boxers
Sportspeople from Salzburg (state)
20th-century Austrian people